Sir John Giles Dunkerley Shaw (16 November 1931 – 12 April 2000), known as Giles Shaw, was a British Conservative Party politician.

Shaw was born in York, the son of an engineer.  He was educated at Sedbergh School and St. John's College, Cambridge, joining the Conservative association and becoming President of the Cambridge Union for the Michaelmas term, 1954.

On returning to York, he became an executive of the confectionery firm Rowntree Mackintosh, rising to advertising manager, then marketing director. He was an advertising manager and chairman of the Conservative Divisional Executive.

Shaw contested Kingston upon Hull West at the 1966 general election. He was subsequently the Member of Parliament (MP) for Pudsey from 1974 until he retired at the 1997 general election.

He held a number of ministerial posts during the Thatcher administration: Parliamentary Under-Secretary, Northern 
Ireland Office (1979–1981); Parliamentary Under-Secretary, 
Department of Environment (1981–1983); Parliamentary Under-
Secretary, Department of Energy (1983–1984); Minister of State, 
Home Office (1984–1986); Minister of State, Department of Trade 
and Industry (1986–1987) 

Shaw was knighted in 1987 in recognition of his service as a Member of Parliament.

Sir Giles was also elected treasurer of the 1922 Committee in 1988, the Speaker's Panel of Chairmen and later became Chairman of the Science and Technology Committee.  He was Chairman of Governors at Sedbergh School from 1992 to 1997.

Shaw was also appointed director of both British Steel plc and Yorkshire Water in 1990, and became the 2nd Chairman of Broadcasters' Audience Research Board Ltd (BARB) in 1997.

Shaw died of a stroke aged 68.

Sources 
Times Guide to the House of Commons, Times Newspapers Limited, 1992 and 1997 editions.

References

External links 
 

1931 births
2000 deaths
People educated at Sedbergh School
Conservative Party (UK) MPs for English constituencies
Alumni of St John's College, Cambridge
Presidents of the Cambridge Union
UK MPs 1974
UK MPs 1974–1979
UK MPs 1979–1983
UK MPs 1983–1987
UK MPs 1987–1992
UK MPs 1992–1997
Northern Ireland Office junior ministers